Brazil is scheduled to compete at the 2024 Summer Olympics in Paris from 26 July to 11 August 2024. Brazilian athletes have appeared in every edition of the Summer Olympic Games from 1920 onwards, except for Amsterdam 1928.

Competitors
The following is the list of number of competitors in the Games.

Football

Summary

Women's tournament

Brazil women's football team qualified for the Olympics by advancing to the final match of the 2022 Copa América Femenina in Bucaramanga, Colombia.

Team roster
 Women's team event – one team of 18 players

Shooting

Brazilian shooters achieved quota places for the following events based on their results at the 2022 and 2023 ISSF World Championships, 2022 and 2024 Championships of the Americas, 2023 Pan American Games, and 2024 ISSF World Olympic Qualification Tournament, if they obtained a minimum qualifying score (MQS) from 14 August 2022 to 9 June 2024.

See also
Brazil at the 2023 Pan American Games
Brazil at the 2024 Summer Paralympics

References

2024
Nations at the 2024 Summer Olympics
2024 in Brazilian sport